Molière is a 1919 play written by Philip Moeller, who subtitled it "A Romantic Play in Three Acts". It has a medium-sized cast, moderate pacing, and two sets; Acts I and III share the same set. Some of the play's characters are historical, figures from the French court of the 1670s. The first two acts have a single scene, while the third has a curtain drop to signal the passage of two hours time. The play shows a few scenes from the twilight of Molière, as he loses the favor of Louis XIV but retains his independence.

The play has an atypical approach for Moeller, who usually wrote historical satires that some critics said verged on burlesque. Also unusual was Moeller's reduced involvement with the original production. At the time he was wrapped up with staging the first Theatre Guild productions. Instead, Molière was shaped for the stage by producer-director Henry Miller, who also played the eponymous lead. Moeller acknowledged Miller's creative contribution in the dedication for the published play.

Characters
Characters are listed in order of appearance within their scope.

Lead 
Armande Béjart — young wife to Molière.  
Jean-Baptiste Poquelin — known to the world as Molière.
Louis XIV — the King of France.   
Françoise — Madame de Montespan, mistress to Louis XIV.

Supporting 
Baron — a seventeen year old member of Molière's company. 
La Forest — a sixty-eight-year-old woman, cook and friend to Molière.
Colinge — an old actor, with Molière since the beginning.
De Luzon — a young courtier.
La Fontaine — the writer of the fables.
Giovanni Lulli — a court musician, a rival to Molière for the royal favor.
Claude Chapelle — a friend to Molière.
The Actress Who Plays Toniette — A lead player in the third act's The Imaginary Invalid.

Featured 
The King's Chamberlin.
Hercules — a black page to Madame de Montespan. 
First Lady in Waiting. 
Second Lady in Waiting. 
Lackey — This is a non-speaking role in the published text.
A Doctor.
Second Actress — A player in the third act's The Imaginary Invalid.

Walk-on 
 Courtiers and Ladies-in-Waiting, Actors and Actresses.

Synopsis

Original production

Background
A newspaper columnist reported in December 1918 that Henry Miller, just coming off of a flop, was looking for a new play to produce, adding that "Blanche Bates and Holbrook Blinn are in the same boat". Whether coincidence or not, within two months all three would start rehearsals for Molière. Henry Miller, whose pockets were deeper and who had a larger company than the other two actor-managers, wound up producing and staging Moeller's play. Estelle Winwood, Forrest Robinson, and Sidney Herbert were also reported in early February 1919 to have been signed by Henry Miller.

The sets were by Lee Simonson; the costumes by Rollo Peters, made by Mme. Freisinger; incidental music was composed by Cassius Freeborn.

Tryouts and revisions
Molière had its first tryout at Ford's Grand Opera House in Baltimore, on February 24, 1919, where it played for a week. The audience was so enthusiastic after Act II that Henry Miller and Blanche Bates had to come out and give short speeches before the play could resume. The local reviewer commended Moeller's dialogue, but thought the beginning of each act dragged, while the second act "savored slightly of the purely theatrical".

The production then went to the Broad Theatre in Philadelphia, opening on March 3, 1919. Moeller was able to attend this opening, and received as big a hand after the second act as the leading actors. A local critic thought it good that Moeller was willing to take a chance on a more serious work, though the first act was "sketchy", a mere prelude to the slender plot. They summed up the play as being "...richer in rhetoric than drama".

Cast

Premiere
Originally intended for Henry Miller's Theater, Molière instead had its Broadway premiere on March 17, 1919, at Klaw and Erlanger's Liberty Theatre. Heywood Broun reported the climatic moment of Molière's death scene was marred by the sound of auto horns coming from the streets outside. A growing problem in the theater district, Broun suggested legal curtailment of the horns even if at the expense of a few pedestrians: "After all, there are so many people and so few good plays".

Reception
The critics liked Molière in spite of its weak drama. Charles Darnton, recalling Madame Sand, thought Moeller "very clever as a grave-digger". Darnton accorded acting honors to Blanche Bates' royal mistress, with nods to Alice Gale's La Forest and Sidney Herbert's La Fontaine. The Brooklyn Citizen also thought Bates' performance the best of the night. The Sun thought Bates' second act and Miller's third act performances excellent, and saluted Holbrook Blinn for keeping Louis XIV from looking ridiculous, but felt Moeller's writing "the most interesting element of the evening".

Heywood Broun remarked that with Moeller's writing the "great comedian appears as a man practically devoid of humor", though he didn't regard this as a fault. John Corbin pointed out Molière's unsatisfied ambition to appear in a drama had now been fulfilled by Moeller's play. Corbin also thought the play too "literesque" but "intelligently so", and was enthused about the scenery, costumes, Alice Gale, and the lead actors. Broun was enthusiastic only about Blanche Bates' performance. He felt Henry Miller's acting was inconsistent and Estelle Winwood more satisfying to the eye than the ear. Holbrook Blinn's acting was admirable, but the royal neck was too short for the regicide in Broun. Flippant though his first night review may read, Broun thought strongly enough about the play to write a two-column article about it a few days later.

Closing
The play's Broadway run closed on May 10, 1919, at the Liberty Theatre. Two nights before, an audience member had slumped from his seat to die on the floor, perhaps in sympathy with Molière and the play.

Touring company
Producer-director Henry Miller chose to begin touring on the West Coast, starting with Los Angeles. Molière opened for a one-week run at the Mason Opera House on July 7, 1919. It then went to the Potter Theatre in Santa Barbara, and the Colombia Theater in San Francisco. The tour swung through Oregon, Washington, Idaho, Utah, and Nebraska before returning east to play Boston, finishing at the Standard Theatre in Brooklyn on November 8, 1919.

Cast

Notes

References

1919 plays
Molière